The Volvo Masters of Malaysia was a men's professional golf tournament which took place in Malaysia. Founded in 1994, it was an Asian Tour event from 1997 to 2001.

Winners

Source:

See also
Malaysian Dunlop Masters
Malaysian Masters
Volvo Masters of Asia

References

External links
Official site

Former Asian Tour events
Golf tournaments in Malaysia
Recurring sporting events established in 1997
Recurring sporting events disestablished in 2001
1997 establishments in Malaysia
2001 disestablishments in Malaysia